Crime science is the study of crime in order to find ways to prevent it. Three features distinguish crime science from criminology: it is single-minded about cutting crime, rather than studying it for its own sake; accordingly it focuses on crime rather than criminals; and it is multidisciplinary, notably recruiting scientific methodology rather than relying on social theory.

Definition
Crime science involves the application of scientific methodologies to prevent or reduce social disorder and find better ways to prevent, detect, and solve crimes.  Crime science studies crime related events and how those events arise, or can be prevented, by attempting to understand the temptations and opportunities which provoke or allow offending, and which affect someone's choice to offend on a particular occasion, rather than assuming the problem is simply about bad people versus good people. It is a empirical approach often involving observational studies or quasi-experiments, as well as using randomised controlled trials, that seek to identify patterns of offending behaviour and factors that influence criminal offending behaviour and crime. The multi-disciplinary approach that involves practitioners from many fields including Policing, Geography, Urban Development, Mathematics, Statistics, Industrial Design, Construction Engineering, Physical Sciences, Medical Sciences, Economics, Computer Science, Psychology, Sociology, Criminology, Forensics, Law, and Public Management.

History
Crime science was conceived by the British broadcaster Nick Ross in the late 1990s (with encouragement from the then Commissioner of the Metropolitan Police, Sir John Stevens and Professor Ken Pease) out of concern that traditional criminology and orthodox political discourse were doing little to influence the ebb and flow of crime (e.g. Ross: Police Foundation Lecture, London, 11 July 2000 (jointly with Sir John Stevens); Parliamentary and Scientific Committee, 22 March 2001; Barlow Lecture, UCL, 6 April 2005). Ross described crime science as, "examining the chain of events that leads to crime in order to cut the weakest link" (Royal Institution Lecture 9 May 2002).

Jill Dando Institute of Crime Science
The first incarnation of crime science was the founding, also by Ross, of the Jill Dando Institute of Crime Science (JDI) at University College London in 2001. In order to reflect its broad disciplinary base, and its departure from the sociological (and often politicised) brand of criminology, the Institute is established in the Engineering Sciences Faculty, with growing ties to the physical sciences such as physics and chemistry but also drawing on the fields of statistics, environmental design, psychology, forensics, policing, economics and geography.

The JDI grew rapidly and spawned a new Department of Security and Crime Science, which itself developed into one of the largest departments of its type in the world. It has established itself as a world-leader in crime mapping and for training crime analysts (civilian crime profilers who work for the police) and its Centre for the Forensic Sciences has been influential in debunking bad science in criminal detection. It established the world's first secure data lab for security and crime pattern analysis and appointed the world's first Professor of Future Crime whose role is to horizon-scan to foresee and forestall tomorrow's crime challenges. The JDI also developed a Security Science Doctoral Research Training Centre (UCL SECReT), which was Europe’s largest centre for doctoral training in security and crime science.

Design Against Crime Research Centre
Another branch of crime science has grown from its combination with design science. At the Central Saint Martins College of Arts and Design a research centre was founded with the focus of studying how design could be used as a tool against crime - the Design against Crime Research Centre. A number of practical theft-aware design practices have emerged there. Examples are chairs with a hanger that allows people to keep their bags within their reach for the whole time, or foldable bicycles that can serve as their own safety lock by wrapping around static poles in the environment.

International Crime Science Network
An international Crime Science Network was formed in 2003, with support from the EPSRC. Since then the term crime science has been variously interpreted, sometimes with a different emphasis from Ross's original description published in 1999, and often favouring situational crime prevention (redesigning products, services and policies to remove opportunities, temptations and provocations and make detection more certain) rather than other forms of intervention. However a common feature is a focus on delivering immediate reductions in crime.

New crime science departments have been established at Waikato, Cincinnati, Philadelphia and elsewhere.

Growth of the Crime Science Field
The concept of crime science appears to be taking root more broadly with: 
The establishment of crime science departments at the University of Waikato in New Zealand, and University of Cincinnati in the US, and elsewhere.
Crime Science courses at several institutions including Northumbria University in the UK, at the University of Twente in the Netherlands. and Temple University, Philadelphia in the US.
A Crime Science Unit at DSTL, the research division of the UK Ministry of Defence.
The term crime science increasingly being adopted by situational and experimental criminologists in the US and Australia.
An annual Crime Science Network gathering in London which draws police and academics from across the world.
A Springer Open Access Interdisciplinary journal devoted to Crime Science. Crime science increasingly being cited in criminology text books and journals papers (sometimes claimed as a new branch of criminology, and sometimes reviled as anti-criminology).
A move in traditional criminology towards the aims originally set out by Ross in his concern for a more evidence-based, scientific approach to crime reduction.
Crime science featuring in several learned journals in other disciplines (such as a special issue of the European Journal of Applied Mathematics devoted to "crime modelling").

See also
Broken windows theory
Parable of the broken window
Crime prevention through environmental design
Evidence-based policing
Problem-oriented policing
Intelligence-led policing
Community policing
Predictive policing
Preventive police
Proactive policing
Peelian principles and Policing by consent
Jill Dando
Jill Dando Institute
Crime statistics
Crime scene investigation
Forensic science
Police science

References

Bibliography

External links
 Jill Dando Institute of Crime Science, U.K.
 Center for Problem-Oriented Policing, U.S.A.
 International Centre for the Prevention of Crime, CA
 Security Science Doctoral Research Training Centre
 New Zealand Institute for Security and Crime Science, N.Z.
Cyber-crime Science

Criminology
Law enforcement theory
Law enforcement
Law enforcement techniques
Crime prevention